Alloperissa is a genus of moths of the family Crambidae. It contains only one species, Alloperissa creagraula, which is found on Fiji.

References

Schoenobiinae
Taxa named by Edward Meyrick
Monotypic moth genera
Moths of Fiji
Crambidae genera